Forsythe/Pettit Racing was an American racing team that competed in the Champ Car World Series owned by Gerald Forsythe and Dan Pettit. The Champ Car effort ceased operations after the 2008 unification of North American open wheel racing.

History

1981–1985
Forsythe Racing began sponsoring Lee Brayton's entry for his son Scott in 1981. Forsythe later started his own team, racing in CART part-time in 1982 with Héctor Rebaque and Danny Sullivan who drove for the team in the 1982 Indianapolis 500 and finished 13th and 14th, respectively. Later that season Rebaque won at Road America. Before Indy, Sullivan finished third at Atlanta Motor Speedway. Also that season Al Unser Jr. made his CART debut for the team at Riverside International Raceway and finished fifth. Moderate success continued from 1983 to 1985, most notably with rookie driver Teo Fabi who won four races in 1983, and started on the pole position at Indianapolis.

1994–1997
The team returned in 1994 as Forsythe-Green Racing with co-owner Barry Green, but by the next year the two had split and Green took their driver Jacques Villeneuve and Canadian cigarette sponsor Player's LTD to his new Team Green and won the 1995 Indianapolis 500 and CART championship. Forsythe reunited with Teo Fabi in a full-time effort in 1995 with Combustion Engineering sponsoring their team.  Forsythe did keep sponsor Player's LTD for his Indy Lights team and Canadian Greg Moore brought home the 1995 Indy Lights championship for Forsythe.  Moore tested a Champ Car for Team Penske late in 1995 so Forsythe quickly signed Moore to run their single 1996 Champ Car entry with Player's moving back from the Team Green squad as Villeneuve left IndyCar for Formula One.  Moore would drive with Forsythe for the five seasons in total, one in Indy Lights where he would win 10 of 12 races, and four in Champ Car until his death at the end of the 1999 season. In Champ Car, Moore would capture five wins and place a best of fifth in the 1998 points standings, all with Forsythe Racing.

1998–2008
In 1998 the team expanded to two cars by adding Patrick Carpentier to the all-Canadian squad. Carpentier would drive for Forsythe through 2004 when he was hired by Cheever Racing of the rival Indy Racing League for 2005.  Patrick captured five wins with the team. For 2000, Forsythe tabbed rookie Alex Tagliani to drive alongside Carpentier.  In three seasons, Tagliani scored three poles and five podiums but no wins, so Alex was replaced by veteran Paul Tracy for the 2003 season. Tracy would win seven races on his way to bringing Forsythe its first CART championship in CART's final year of operations. In 2006, Mario Domínguez, who had replaced Carpentier, was fired mid-season and Forsythe brought in displaced American A. J. Allmendinger. Allmendinger proceeded to win his first three races with the team, his first Champ Car victories. Allmendinger was teammates with Paul Tracy who finished fourth in points in 2004 and 2005 after his championship-winning season. However, Allmendinger and the team were not able to come to terms for 2007 and Allmendinger announced he would be going to NASCAR Nextel Cup with Team Red Bull. Forsythe would later announce Dominguez's return to his team on March 30. Dominguez, however, was replaced by Oriol Servià on a race by race basis until Servia was hired full-time. For the 2008 season, Jerry Forsythe and former RuSPORT owner Dan Pettit, were to merge their teams into Forsythe/Pettit Racing to field at least two cars. However, changes brought about the unification of open wheel racing into the IndyCar Series. This made competitive racing financially unviable in the eyes of Forsythe and he elected not to race in the IndyCar Series in 2008. The team's Atlantic operation, Forsythe Racing continued to contest that series through the end of the 2008 season and the team fielded three of the team's Panoz DP01 chassis in the 2008 Toyota Grand Prix of Long Beach.

On July 15, 2008 Forsythe Racing announced that they would return to the Firestone Indy Lights Series grid in 2009. According to additional reports, Forsythe Racing were close to finalizing IRL IndyCar Series and American Le Mans Series programs for 2009, according to team manager Ken Swieck. Swieck confirmed that Forsythe intended to compete in both series rather than choosing one or the other. However, Forsythe never fielded any entries in either series.

Statistics
The Forsythe team and its derivatives have amassed 34 CART and Champ Car victories and single championship in 2003 with Canadian Paul Tracy.

Drivers who competed for Forsythe
 A. J. Allmendinger (2006)
 Patrick Carpentier (1998–2004)
 Kevin Cogan (1984)
 Mario Domínguez (2005–2007)
 Corrado Fabi (1984)
 Teo Fabi (1983–1984, 1995)
 Memo Gidley (2000)
 Bryan Herta (2000–2001)
 Howdy Holmes (1985)
 Tony Kanaan (1999)
 Rodolfo Lavin (2004)
 David Martínez (2006–2008)
 Franck Montagny (2008)
 Greg Moore (1996–1999)
 Jan Lammers (1985)
 John Paul Jr. (1985)
 Héctor Rebaque (1982)
 Buddy Rice (2006)
 Oriol Servià (2007)
 Danny Sullivan (1982)
 Alex Tagliani (2000–2002)
 Paul Tracy (2003–2008)
 Al Unser Jr. (1982)
 Jacques Villeneuve (1994)
 Lee Bentham (1997-1999)

Racing results

Complete CART / Champ Car World Series results
(key) (results in bold indicate pole position) (results in italics indicate fastest lap)

 The Firestone Firehawk 600 was canceled after qualifying due to excessive g-forces on the drivers.

Complete IndyCar Series results
(key)

 Run to Champ Car specifications.
 Non-points-paying, exhibition race.

Indy car wins

 Note: this does not include the win achieved by Jacques Villeneuve at Road America in 1994 as a driver of Forsythe-Green Racing.

References

External links
 

Champ Car teams
American auto racing teams
Indy Lights teams
Atlantic Championship teams
IndyCar Series teams
Auto racing teams established in 1982
Auto racing teams disestablished in 2008
Red Bull sports teams